The 1920–21 Yale Bulldogs men's ice hockey season was the 26th season of play for the program.

Season
Before the start of the season Yale and five other elite programs (Cornell, Dartmouth, Harvard, Pennsylvania and Princeton) met to organize a new hockey league. Issues arose from some potential members, namely Harvard, and instead of a formal league a loose association was formed in order to discuss issues, settle arguments and facilitate scheduling.

After Talbot Hunter's sudden departure from the team the program brought in former player Francis Bangs as coach. Unfortunately, the team was still having to use the Philadelphia Ice Palace as its home arena since the temporary rinks that were built on the Whitney Avenue tennis courts proved insufficient. After opening up with two losses before Christmas, Yale headed to Pittsburgh to face Carnegie Tech for the first time in over a decade. The Tartans had just brought their program back and were hardly a match for the experienced Bulldogs but the Tartans showed promise.

Yale won a third consecutive game against another program that returned after several years away (Columbia) but when they faced stiffer competition, the Elis were unable to raise their game. In their final five game of the season, Yale managed only 3 goals and surrendered 28. Their best performance came against Dartmouth when the two teams played a scoreless contest although the game was called due to poor ice conditions. Yale lost all four of its Triangular Hockey League games and finished the season with a very poor record.

In the two games against Harvard and the Dartmouth match, Yale's opponents insisted on playing 7–on-7. Records indicate these were the final games played by Yale under the old format as all colleges switched to the more popular 6-on-6 style the following season.

Roster

Standings

Schedule and Results

|-
!colspan=12 style="color:white; background:#00356B" | Regular Season

† The match was called after only three minutes had elapsed in the second period due to extremely poor ice conditions.

References

Yale Bulldogs men's ice hockey seasons
Yale
Yale
Yale
Yale